Scopula manes is a moth of the family Geometridae. It is found in China.

References

Moths described in 1936
manes
Moths of Asia